Cannon is a lunar impact crater that is located near the east-northeastern limb of the Moon's near side. It lies just to the northwest of the Mare Marginis, and south-southeast of the crater Plutarch. Farther to the east-northeast is Hubble.

This is a worn and eroded formation with an interior floor that has been resurfaced by lava. A small crater overlies the north rim, which forms a notch in the side. Tiny craters also lie across the rim northeast and at the southern edge. The interior is level and nearly featureless, with only a few tiny scattered craterlets to mark the surface. This floor has the same albedo as the surrounding terrain.

The crater is named after Annie Jump Cannon, an astronomer who classified 300,000 stellar bodies.

Satellite craters
By convention these features are identified on lunar maps by placing the letter on the side of the crater midpoint that is closest to Cannon.

See also 
 1120 Cannonia, main-belt asteroid

References

 
 
 
 
 
 
 
 
 
 
 
 

Impact craters on the Moon